Shih-t'ou can refer to:

Shitou Xiqian (Shih-t'ou Hsi-ch'ien), an 8th-century Zen Buddhist monk
Stone City, an ancient fortified city in Nanjing, China